Cilla The Musical is a jukebox musical written by Jeff Pope based on the early career and music of Cilla Black and Pope's 2014 ITV drama biopic of the same name.

Production

Original UK tour (2017–18) 
Produced by Bill Kenwright and Laurie Mansfield, the production opened at the Liverpool Empire Theatre from 7 September 2017 before touring the UK, starring Kara Lilly Hayworth as Cilla and Andrew Lancel as Brian Epstein. The production was directed by Kenwright and Bob Tomson, choreographed by Carole Todd, set and costume designed by Gary McCann, lighting designed by Nick Richings, sound designed by Dan Samson, wigs designed by Richard Mawbey, with Scott Alder as musical director and Gary Hickeson as musical producer and orchestral arrangement.

The production was scheduled to begin another from September 2020 at the Liverpool Empire Theatre, starring Sheridan Smith reprising her role as Cilla from the TV series, however it was cancelled due to the COVID-19 pandemic. On 29 November 2020 at the Royal Variety Performance, Smith performed "Anyone Who Had A Heart" and "You're My World" from the musical, opposite Andrew Lancel who was due to reprise the role of Brian Epstein.

Musical numbers 

 "Anyone Who Had a Heart"
 "Alfie"
 "Something Tells Me (Something's Gonna Happen Tonight)"
 "Twist and Shout"
 "California Dreamin'"
"You're My World"

Cast and characters

References 

2017 musicals
Biographical musicals
British musicals
Cilla Black
Cultural depictions of pop musicians
Jukebox musicals
Musicals based on television series
Plays set in the 20th century